The Transitional Federal Government (TFG) was internationally recognized as a provisional government of the Republic of Somalia from 14 October 2004 until 20 August 2012, when its tenure officially ended and the Federal Government of Somalia was inaugurated.

Succeeding the Transitional National Government (TNG), the TFG was the second interim administration aiming to restore national institutions to Somalia after the 1991 collapse of the Siad Barre regime and the ensuing civil war.

The TFG was established as one of the Transitional Federal Institutions (TFIs) of government as defined in the Transitional Federal Charter (TFC) adopted in November 2004 by the Transitional Federal Parliament (TFP).

Background

Legal structure of Somalia

The legal structure in Somalia was divided along three lines:  religious law, traditional clan law and civil law.

Religious law

Following the fall of the Siad Barre regime in 1991, the Islamic Courts Union was formed to address lawlessness  in Somalia.

The residents of Mogadishu were reportedly happy with the authority of the Islamic Courts Union's. There were fewer guns on the streets and people were able to move more freely around the city without fear of attack after they took control.

By the end of 2006, the Islamic Courts Union (ICU), gained control of much of the southern part of the country.

Traditional clan law 

Xeer is the traditional legal system of Somalia, and one of the three systems from which formal Somali law draws its inspiration, the others being civil law and Islamic law. It is believed to pre-date Islam, although it was influenced by Islam and retains the faith elements, the proceeding under rule pre-date Islam. Under this system, elders, known as the  serve as mediator judges and help settle court cases, taking precedent and custom into account. Xeer is polycentric in that different groups within Somali society have different interpretations of xeer.

Civil law

While Somalia's formal judicial system was largely destroyed after the fall of the Siad Barre regime, it was rebuilt to be administered under different regional governments such as the autonomous Puntland  and Somaliland macro-regions. 

In the case of the Transitional Federal Government (TFG), a new judicial structure was formed through various international conferences.

Despite some significant political differences between them, all of these administrations shared similar legal structures, much of which were predicated on the judicial systems of previous Somali administrations. These similarities in civil law included:

A charter which affirmed the primacy of shari'a or Islamic law, although in practice shari'a was applied mainly to matters such as marriage, divorce, inheritance and civil issues.
The charter guaranteed respect for universal standards of human rights to all subjects of the law. It also assured the independence of the judiciary, which in turn was protected by a judicial committee.
There was a three-tier judicial system including a supreme court, a court of appeals, and courts of first instance (either divided between district and regional courts, or a single court per region).
The laws of the civilian government which were in effect prior to the military coup d'état that saw the Barre regime into power were to remain in force unless the laws were amended.

Structure of TFG

The Transitional Federal Government (TFG) constituted the executive branch of government, with the TFP serving as the legislative branch. The government was headed by the President of Somalia, to whom the cabinet reported through the Prime Minister.

Constitution
Alongside the national constitution, the Transitional Federal Charter of the Somali Republic (TFC) laid out the basic way in which the government was to operate.

Capital

As with previous Somali administrations, the Transitional Federal Charter of the Somali Republic recognized Mogadishu as the capital of Somalia. The Transitional Federal Parliament of Somalia met in the city, which was also the seat of the nation's Supreme court. In addition, Mogadishu was the location of the presidential palace, Villa Somalia, where the President resided. The Prime Minister also lived in the city. Mogadishu is the largest city in Somalia and had a population of over 2 million people. Prior to the civil war, it was known as the "White Pearl of the Indian Ocean".

State governments

Under the Transitional Federal Government, local state governments maintained some power over their affairs and maintained their own police and security forces, but were subject to the authority of the Transitional Federal Government.

Parliament

The Transitional Federal Parliament elected the President and Prime Minister, and had the authority to pass and veto laws. It was also in charge of governance and administration of Mogadishu. Each of the four major clans held 61 seats, while an alliance of minority clans held 31 seats.
 
After an alliance with the Islamic Courts Union and other Islamist groups, the Islamists were awarded 200 seats. Representatives of citizens' groups and representatives of the Somali diaspora held 75 seats. By law, at least 12% of all representatives had to be women. Members of parliament are selected through traditional clan leaders or shura councils.

Executive branch

A President was elected by Parliament. The President was head of government, and chose the Prime Minister, who would lead the cabinet.

Council of Ministers

The Cabinet, formally known as the Council of Ministers, at first comprised 42 offices, but was later slimmed down to 31 portfolios  during a period of contention in 2006. In 2010, it was further scaled down to 18 posts. The Council of Ministers was appointed by the Prime Minister.

The government posts and ministerial positions were as follows:

Judiciary

Under the Transitional Federal Government, a Supreme court based in Mogadishu was established, as well as an Appeals Court. Smaller local courts were also established. A Judicial Service Council directed all judiciary and advised the president. All Sharia courts established by the ICU were discontinued, but Islamic principles were to be upheld in TFG courts.

Education

The Ministry of Education was officially responsible for education in Somalia, with about 15% of the government's budget being spent on education. However, in practice, the education system was largely private.

In 2006, the autonomous Puntland region in the northeast was the second territory in Somalia after the Somaliland region to introduce free primary schools, with teachers receiving their salaries from the Puntland administration. As of 2007, primary schools have also seen a 28% increase in enrollment over the preceding three years.

Several universities in Somalia, including Mogadishu University, were ranked among the 100 best universities in Africa despite the harsh environment, which was hailed as a triumph for grass-roots initiatives.

Healthcare
The Ministry of Health headed the country's healthcare system. The  Minister of Health was Qamar Adan Ali. The autonomous Puntland region had its own local Ministry of Health, which is headed by Dr. Mohamed Bashir Ali Bihi, as did the Somaliland region in northwestern Somalia, with its Ministry of Health led by Osman Bile Ali.

Media
The transitional federal government had two main media outlets: Radio Mogadishu, the state-run radio station; and Somali National Television, the national television channel.

Military and police

The Transitional Federal Government's Ministry of Defense was officially responsible for the Somali National Army (SNA).

In August 2011, a TFG-Puntland cooperative agreement called for the creation of a Somali Marine Force unit, of which the already established Puntland Maritime Police Force (PMPF) would form a part.

There were also plans for the re-establishment of the Somali Air Force.

In addition, a new police force was re-established to maintain law and order. The first police academy to be built in Somalia for several years opened on 20 December 2005 at Armo, 100 kilometres south of Bosaso. The Somali police also had a criminal investigations department in Mogadishu.

The autonomous Puntland and Somaliland regions within Somalia had their own security forces.

History

The new Transitional Federal Government of Abdullahi Yusuf Ahmed wished to establish authority over Somalia, and sought assistance from Ethiopian troops to forcibly seize power from the Islamic Courts Union through three years of bitter warfare.

A 2008 Human Rights Watch report called 'So Much to Fear' accused the Transitional Federal Government, while under the leadership of President Abdullahi Yusuf Ahmed, of human rights abuses and war crimes including murder, rape, assault, and looting. The report also states that the TFG police force were implicated in arbitrary arrests of ordinary civilians in order to extort ransoms from their families.

The Transitional Federal Government officially comprised the executive branch of government, with the TFP serving as the legislative branch. The government was headed by the President of Somalia, to whom the cabinet reported through the Prime Minister. However, it was also used as a general term to refer to all three branches collectively.

On 8 January 2007, as the Battle of Ras Kamboni raged, TFG President Abdullahi Yusuf Ahmed, entered Mogadishu for the first time since being elected to office. The government then relocated to Villa Somalia in the capital from its interim location in Baidoa. This marked the first time since the fall of the Siad Barre regime in 1991 that the federal government controlled most of the country.

Following this defeat, the Islamic Courts Union splintered into several different factions. Some of the more radical elements, including Al-Shabaab, regrouped to continue their insurgency against the TFG and oppose the Ethiopian military's presence in Somalia. Throughout 2007 and 2008, Al-Shabaab scored military victories, seizing control of key towns and ports in both central and southern Somalia. At the end of 2008, the group had captured Baidoa but not Mogadishu. By January 2009, Al-Shabaab and other militias had managed to force the Ethiopian troops to retreat, leaving behind an under-equipped African Union peacekeeping force to assist the Transitional Federal Government's troops.

To shore up his rule in Mogadishu, Yusuf deployed thousands of his own troops from Puntland to Mogadishu. Financial support for this effort was provided by the autonomous region's government. This left little revenue for Puntland's own security forces and civil service employees, leaving the territory vulnerable to piracy and terrorist attacks.

On 29 December 2008, Yusuf announced before a united parliament in Baidoa his resignation as President of Somalia. In his speech, which was broadcast on national radio, Yusuf expressed regret at failing to end the country's seventeen-year conflict as his government had mandated to do. He also blamed the international community for its failure to support the government, and said that the speaker of parliament would succeed him in office per the Charter of the Transitional Federal Government.

President Yusuf deployed thousands of his own troops from Puntland to Mogadishu to sustain the battle against insurgent elements in the southern part of the country. Financial support for this effort was provided by the autonomous region's government. This left little revenue for Puntland's own security forces and civil service employees.

Coalition government

Between 31 May and 9 June 2008, representatives of Somalia's federal government and the moderate Alliance for the Re-liberation of Somalia (ARS) group of Islamist rebels participated in peace talks in Djibouti brokered by the former United Nations Special Envoy to Somalia, Ahmedou Ould-Abdallah. The conference ended with a signed agreement calling for the withdrawal of Ethiopian troops in exchange for the cessation of armed confrontation. Parliament was subsequently expanded to 550 seats to accommodate ARS members, which then elected Sheikh Sharif Sheikh Ahmed, the former ARS chairman, to office. President Sharif shortly afterwards appointed Omar Abdirashid Ali Sharmarke, the son of slain former President Abdirashid Ali Sharmarke, as the nation's new Prime Minister.

With the help of a small team of African Union troops, the coalition government also began a counteroffensive in February 2009 to retake control of the southern half of the country. To solidify its control of southern Somalia, the TFG formed an alliance with the Islamic Courts Union, other members of the Alliance for the Re-liberation of Somalia, and Ahlu Sunna Waljama'a, a moderate Sufi militia. Furthermore, Al-Shabaab and Hizbul Islam, the two main Islamist groups in opposition, began to fight amongst themselves in mid-2009.

As a truce, in March 2009, Somalia's coalition government announced that it would re-implement Shari'a as the nation's official judicial system. However, conflict continued in the southern and central parts of the country. Within months, the coalition government had gone from holding about 70% of south-central Somalia's conflict zones, territory which it had inherited from the previous Yusuf administration, to losing control of over 80% of the disputed territory to the Islamist insurgents.

During the coalition government's brief tenure, Somalia topped the Fund For Peace's Failed States Index for three consecutive years. In 2009, Transparency International ranked the nation in last place on its annual Corruption Perceptions Index (CPI), a metric that purports to show the prevalence of corruption in a country's public sector. A World Bank report also alleged that about $130 million that the coalition government had received over this 2009 and 2010 period was unaccounted for. In July 2012, a report by the UN Monitoring Group on Somalia and Eritrea (SEMG) submitted to the UN Security Council alleged that between 2009 and 2010, around 70 percent of funds that had been earmarked for development and reconstruction in Somalia were unaccounted for. President Sharif Sheikh Ahmed rebuked the claims, indicating in particular that a $3 million payment from the Government of Oman had gone toward legitimate government expenses, including loans, security forces and parliament. Ahmed also asserted that the SEMG paper had been "timed to coincide with the end of [the] transition period in order to discredit the TFG," and that the Monitoring Group was the "wrong approach for Somalia's peace and development."

New government
On 14 October 2010, diplomat Mohamed Abdullahi Mohamed was appointed the new Prime Minister of Somalia after the resignation of Premier Omar Abdirashid Ali Sharmarke.

Per the Transitional Federal Government's (TFG) Charter, Prime Minister Mohamed named a new Cabinet on 12 November 2010, which has been lauded by the international community. The allotted ministerial positions were reduced from 39 to 18. Only two Ministers from the previous Cabinet were reappointed: Hussein Abdi Halane, the former Minister of Finance and a well-regarded figure in the international community, was put in charge of a consolidated Ministry of Finance and Treasury; and Dr. Mohamud Abdi Ibrahim remained the minister of Commerce and Industry. Ahlu Sunna Waljama'a, a moderate Sufi group and an important military ally of the TFG, was also accorded the key Interior and Labour ministries. The remaining ministerial positions were largely assigned to technocrats new to the Somali political arena.

In its first 50 days in office, Prime Minister Mohamed's new administration completed its first monthly payment of stipends to government soldiers, and initiated the implementation of a full biometric register for the security forces within a window of four months. Additional members of the Independent Constitutional Commission were also appointed to engage Somali constitutional lawyers, religious scholars and experts in Somali culture over the nation's upcoming new constitution, a key part of the government's Transitional Federal Tasks. In addition, high level federal delegations were dispatched to defuse clan-related tensions in several regions. According to the prime minister of Somalia, to improve transparency, Cabinet ministers fully disclosed their assets and signed a code of ethics.

An Anti-Corruption Commission with the power to carry out formal investigations and to review government decisions and protocols was also established so as to more closely monitor all activities by public officials. Furthermore, unnecessary trips abroad by members of government were prohibited, and all travel by ministers now require the Premier's consent. A budget outlining 2011's federal expenditures was also put before and approved by members of parliament, with the payment of civil service employees prioritized. In addition, a full audit of government property and vehicles is being put into place. On the war front, the new government and its AMISOM allies also managed to secure control of Mogadishu by August 2011. According to the African Union and Prime Minister Mohamed, with increasing troop strength the pace of territorial gains is expected to greatly accelerate.

In June 2011, following the Kampala Accord, the mandates of the President, the Parliament Speaker, and Deputies were extended until August 2012.

On 19 June 2011, Mohamed Abdullahi Mohamed resigned from his position as Prime Minister of Somalia as part of the controversial Kampala Accord's conditions. The agreement would also see the mandates of the President, the Parliament Speaker and Deputies extended until August 2012, after which point new elections are to be organized, including a parliamentary vote-based presidential election. Abdiweli Mohamed Ali, Mohamed's former Minister of Planning and International Cooperation, was later named permanent Prime Minister.

Backed by the United Nations, the African Union, as well as the United States, the TFG battled Al Shabaab insurgents to assume full control of the southern part of the country. By August 2011, the government, under President Sharif Sheikh Ahmed and its AMISOM (African Union Mission in Somalia) allies managed to secure control over all of Mogadishu.

In February 2012, Somali government officials met in the northeastern town of Garowe to discuss post-transition arrangements. After extensive deliberations attended by regional actors and international observers, the conference ended in a signed agreement between TFG President Sharif Sheikh Ahmed, Prime Minister Abdiweli Mohamed Ali, Speaker of Parliament Sharif Adan Sharif Hassan, Puntland President Abdirahman Mohamed Farole, Galmudug President Mohamed Ahmed Alim and Ahlu Sunnah Wal Jama'a representative Khalif Abdulkadir Noor stipulating that: a) a new 225 member bicameral parliament would be formed, consisting of an upper house seating 54 Senators as well as a lower house; b) 30% of the National Constituent Assembly (NCA) is earmarked for women; c) the President is to be appointed via a constitutional election; and d) the Prime Minister is selected by the President and he/she then names his/her Cabinet. On 23 June 2012, the Somali federal and regional leaders met again and approved a draft constitution after several days of deliberation. The National Constituent Assembly overwhelmingly passed the new constitution on 1 August, with 96% voting for it, 2% against it, and 2% abstaining.

International relations

The Transitional Federal Government is internationally recognized as the official government of Somalia. It occupies Somalia's seat in the United Nations, the African Union, and the Organisation of Islamic Cooperation (OIC). The Permanent Representative of Somalia to the United Nations is Elmi Ahmed Duale. The Deputy Permanent Representative is Idd Beddel Mohamed. Somalia is one of the founding members of the OIC. The TFG also has ambassadors in other countries.

The Transitional Federal Government currently maintains embassies in 34 countries. Ethiopia maintains an embassy in Mogadishu, and consulates in Hargeisa in Somaliland and in Garowe in Puntland. Djibouti re-opened its embassy in Mogadishu in December 2010. The following year, India also re-opened its embassy in the capital after a twenty-year absence, as did Turkey. Italy maintains a special diplomatic delegation and a Technical Mission to Mogadishu, and is scheduled to re-open its embassy in the city. In 2011, the United Kingdom likewise announced plans to re-open its embassy in Mogadishu, with Iran following suit in 2012.

Passports
For travel, Somali citizens can obtain a Somali passport from government-designated locations or from Somali embassies abroad.

See also
Child soldiers in Somalia

References

External links
Benadir Regional Administration – Transitional Federal Government of Somalia
Somali Peace Process from the African Union Mission in Somalia

 
2004 establishments in Somalia
Government of Somalia
Provisional governments
Somalia War (2006–2009)
Somali Civil War (2009–present)
2012 disestablishments in Somalia
Factions in the Somali Civil War